The Rice County Courthouse of Lyons, Kansas is located at 101 W. Commercial St.   It was listed on the National Register of Historic Places in 2002.

It has a hipped roof with dormers and a central clock tower.

References

Government buildings on the National Register of Historic Places in Kansas
Romanesque Revival architecture in Kansas
Rice County, Kansas
Courthouses in Kansas